The HTC Evo Shift 4G (trademarked in capitals as EVO Shift 4G or The Evo Has an Alter Evo) is a smartphone developed by HTC Corporation and marketed as the concurrent/sequel to Sprint's flagship Android smartphone, running on its 4G WiMAX network. The smartphone launched on January 9, 2011.

History

Development 
During development, the device was known as the HTC Speedy and HTC Knight or PG06100, which was leaked throughout the internet and was already known as a variant of the HTC EVO with a keyboard.

Release 
The EVO Shift was released on January 9, 2011 in the United States through Sprint.

Features 
The HTC EVO Shift 4G features a full size QWERTY keypad and a 5-megapixel camera with 720p video.

Screen and input 
Most gloves and styli prevent the necessary electric conductivity required for use on the capacitive display.

The EVO Shift has a balanced hardware-software user interface, featuring seven hardware/touch sensitive buttons, four of which are on the front of the device. Input and interaction with the device is balanced between the hardware and software user interface and in most situations require users to use hardware/touch sensitive buttons often throughout Android OS. Like most Android devices, the EVO features four main touch-sensitive buttons on the front of its device which are the Home, Menu, Back, and Search. The Home button displays the Sense Home screen. The Menu button displays menu options in various applications although it can also be used for other purposes, the Back button displays the prior page or screen a user was on, and the Search button mainly allows search through the phone, although it can also be used for other purposes in various applications. Unlike most smart-phones, the device has no hardware ringer switch. On the left spine are placed the volume adjustment controls. A multifunction sleep/wake button is placed on the top of the device which serves as the unit's power and sleep button and also controls phone calls. The touchscreen furnishes the remainder of the user interface.

The device responds to four sensors. A proximity sensor deactivates the display and touchscreen when the device is brought near the face during a call. This is done to save battery power and to prevent inadvertent inputs from the user's face and ears. An ambient light sensor adjusts display brightness which in turn saves battery power. A 3-axis accelerometer senses the orientation of the phone and changes the screen accordingly, allowing the user to easily switch between page orientation modes. A geomagnetism sensor provides orientation with respect to Earth's magnetic field. The proximity sensor and the accelerometer can also be used to control and/or interact with third party apps, notably games. The device also contains a temperature sensor used for monitoring the temperature of the battery.

The device also features a GPS chip allowing applications (with user's permissions) to report the devices location allowing for location-based services and can also be useful to turn-by-turn navigation apps.

Processor and memory 
The EVO Shift is powered by the Qualcomm MSM7630 chipset which contains a Snapdragon ARM microprocessor clocked at 800 MHz and an embedded Adreno 205 graphics chip capable of up to 41 million triangles per second.

It features 512 MB of eDRAM which allows for a smoother experience with Android OS, applications, and the HTC Sense user interface. The device also features 2 GB of built-in ROM which is mainly used for the system software.

Cameras 
The Evo Shift 4G features a rear-facing backside illumination 5-megapixel camera capable of recording 720p HD videos (H.264 video compression) and features an LED flash.

Storage 

Like many other Android mobile devices, the HTC EVO Shift 4G features a microSD slot in addition to the onboard memory which allows for user-expandable storage. The device supports microSD cards of sizes up to 32 GB. With Android version 2.2 (Froyo) preinstalled, the OS supports applications which permit themselves to be installed on the SD card.

The device comes pre-installed with a 2 GB Class 2 microSDHC card.

Audio and output
The back of the EVO Shift sports a speaker which is used for most applications like music, applications, and such as the main speaker. A loudspeaker is located above the screen which serves as an earpiece. The microphone is featured on the bottom of the phone which is used for phone calls and voice-commands although it can also be used in many other third-party applications. The Sprint Mobile Hotspot application allows users to share the device's mobile broadband on up to eight devices.

Smartphone connectivity
The EVO Shift features a CDMA cellular radio that supports 3G EVDO, revisions 0, A, and the as yet undeployed B allowing faster download and upload speeds, and better power efficiency. As well as WiMAX, protocol known as 802.16e, which features speeds of up to 10 Mbit/s on the downlink, and 1 Mbit/s on the uplink. The device is marketed as a 4G phone, WiMAX is considered to be a 4G technology based on 4G standards set by ITU-R.

Battery and power 
The device comes pre-installed with a 1500mAh Li-ion rechargeable battery that is designed to be user-replaceable. The Battery has different notches but are interchangeable with the batteries from the HTC Incredible, HTC Touch Pro 2, HTC Hero (CDMA), and HTC EVO 4G.

Software
The device sports the HTC Sense user interface which runs on the Android operating system and presents information through the Android desktop widgets and application, and includes launchers, app drawer, and lock screen replacements. Sense also brings a modified browser and home screen. The device first came with Android OS 2.2 "FroYo".

Interface
The interface is based around home screen panels which in total are seven panels that allows user-customization. By default, the center home screen panel features a digital clock located on the top of the screen and weather animations of the current weather in the device's location, the remaining space in the bottom can be customized to the user's preference. The launcher which is located at the bottom of the screen displays icons to open the App Drawer, Phone application, and the ability to add widgets on the Android desktop, and is shown throughout all seven home screen panels. Users can switch from one panel to another by sliding left or right. A small bar which sits on the launcher represents the current panel the device is viewing. Pinching the home screen (or pressing the home button if a user is on the center panel) brings up Leap screen which shows thumbnail views of all the home screen panels and lets users "leap" to another home screen panel easily. Unlike other custom user interfaces for the Android OS like Samsung's TouchWiz UI, HTC Sense does not allow disabling or removing panels.

Most of the input on the device is given through the touchscreen which understands complex gestures using multi-touch. Android's interaction techniques enable users to move up or down by a touch-drag motion of the finger. However the buttons on the front of the device will often require use in various applications in Android OS, as the buttons play an important part in the user interface.

Acquiring root access 
The Sprint HTC Evo Shift 4G comes from the factory locked without any root privileges. There was almost immediately a temporary root exploit available, and as of 1/28 there is a permanent root. The permanent root sets the phones S-OFF, which means the NAND, or ROM, can be written to without signature checks. This allows for custom, unsigned images to be flashed.

Reception 
The EVO Shift 4G has generally been praised by reviewers, especially in regards to its processing speed, screen quality, and pricing.

Device clock reference 
The device clock is 15 seconds faster than UTC, either with Android 2.1 or 2.2; a manual clock setting does not override seconds, and root authority would be needed to overcome issue using ntp software. The 15-second offset hints the number of leap seconds introduced since GPS inception in 1980 rather than an epoch issue and has been reported as an Android bug on Dec 16, 2009.

Warranty 
The phone comes with a 1-year warranty, which does not cover scratches, cracks, smudge marks, liquid damage, and other forms of physical damage. Sending phones for repair is typically handled by the phone service provider, rather than through HTC.

Design 
The EVO Shift's design is derived from its brothers, the T-Mobile G2, HTC Evo, and HTC Hero. Another feature is Android-specific buttons. The device has nearly the same dimensions, which are:
 high
 wide
 deep

See also
 List of Android devices
 Android (operating system)
 HTC Desire HD
 List of HTC phones
 HTC EVO 4G
 Galaxy Nexus

References

External links
 HTC Evo Shift 4G Official Website

Mobile phones introduced in 2011
EVO
Android (operating system) devices
Discontinued smartphones